Man and Technics: A Contribution to a Philosophy of Life (German: Der Mensch und die Technik) is a 1931 book by Oswald Spengler, in which the author discusses a critique of technology and industrialism and uses the Nietzschean concept of the will to power to understand man's nature.

Building on his previous ideas in The Decline of the West, Spengler argues that many of the Western world's great achievements may soon become spectacles for our descendants to marvel at, as we do with the pyramids of Egypt or the baths of Rome. He  points in particular to the tendency of Western technology to spread to hostile "colored races" which would then use the weapons against the West. In Spengler's view, western culture will be destroyed from within by materialism, and destroyed by others through economic competition and warfare. 

,  and

References

External links
 The twelfth and final part of the book
 The New York Review of Books review by H. Stuart Hughes (requires subscription)
 Full text on archive.org

1931 books
Philosophy books
Books in philosophy of technology
German books
Works by Oswald Spengler